Kincardine and Deeside was a county constituency represented in the House of Commons of the Parliament of the United Kingdom from 1983 until 1997. It was mainly replaced by West Aberdeenshire and Kincardine, apart from the parts of the seat within the borders of Aberdeen City Council, which joined Aberdeen South.

Boundaries
Kincardine and Deeside District, and the City of Aberdeen District electoral divisions of Auchinyell, Craigton, Kincorth, and Peterculter.

Members of Parliament

Elections

Elections of the 1980s

Elections of the 1990s

References

Historic parliamentary constituencies in Scotland (Westminster)
Constituencies of the Parliament of the United Kingdom established in 1983
Constituencies of the Parliament of the United Kingdom disestablished in 1997
History of Aberdeenshire